June 2009 is a compilation album by American recording artist Toro y Moi, released on April 24, 2012, by Carpark Records. Originally sold as a tour-only CD-R, it consists of previously unreleased material produced and recorded by Bundick in June 2009, before his debut studio album, Causers of This (2010), was recorded. Aside from standard CD and digital versions, the album was also released as a limited edition box set containing five 7" vinyl singles, each with their own cover art, as well as a free digital download, postcard, and stickers.

Track listing

References

2012 compilation albums
Carpark Records albums
Toro y Moi albums